Ban Phraek is the northernmost district of Ayutthaya province.

History
Tambon Phraek was separated from Maha Rat district to become a minor district (king amphoe) in 1937. It was upgraded to a full district on 10 December 1959.

Geography
Neighboring districts are (from the north clockwise) Mueang Lopburi of Lopburi province, Don Phut of Saraburi province, Maha Rat of Ayutthaya Province, and Chaiyo of Ang Thong province.

Administration
The district is divided into five sub-districts (tambon), which are further subdivided into 27 villages (muban). Ban Phraek has township (thesaban tambon) status and covers parts of tambon Ban Phraek and Sam Phaniang. There are two tambon administrative organizations (TAO).

Ban Phraek